Paweł Skrzypek (born 23 August 1971) is a retired Polish football defender.

References

1971 births
Living people
Polish footballers
Raków Częstochowa players
Legia Warsaw players
Pogoń Szczecin players
Amica Wronki players
Flota Świnoujście players
Association football defenders
Poland international footballers